Elst is a railway station located in Elst, Netherlands. The station was opened on 15 June 1879 and is located on the Arnhem–Nijmegen railway. The station is operated by Nederlandse Spoorwegen, with the service towards Tiel operated by Arriva. Just south of the station the Elst–Dordrecht railway branches off towards Tiel.

The station has 3 platforms, a waiting area with multiple covered waiting areas. There is a bus stop located at the west side of the station, a parking garage on the east side, and bicycle sheds on both sides

At the time when the Elst–Dordrecht railway had an important significance for freight transport, was there a shunting yard (without a shunting hump) located east of the station. The tracks were broken up in the 1980s, and the location is no longer visible since the car and bicycle tunnels were built. At this moment is an outpatient clinic is being built on the location of the shunting yard.

The trains from the Elst–Dordrecht railway have to cross the track in the direction of Nijmegen before entering Elst. Because the Arnhem–Nijmegen railway is quite busy, it was decided to give the trains from the Elst–Dordrecht railway their own departure track with a platform in Elst. This is a terminal track so that the trains to the Elst–Dordrecht railway no longer depart from Arnhem but from Elst. Construction of the third track started in early 2014. Since the end of 2014, the third track can be used. The end track has been put into use from the 2017 timetable, with Elst being the terminus of the Arnhem Centraal - Tiel train service once an hour during off-peak hours.

Train services

Bus services

Travia 
The singer and composer Pierre Kartner was born in a house near the railway station, where his father worked as a station master.

External links
NS website 
Dutch Public Transport journey planner 

Railway stations in Gelderland
Railway stations opened in 1879
Railway stations on the Arnhem - Nijmegen railway line
Overbetuwe
1879 establishments in the Netherlands
Railway stations in the Netherlands opened in the 19th century